Jefferson's Birthday officially honors the birth of the third U.S. president, Thomas Jefferson on April 13, 1743. This day was recognized by Franklin D. Roosevelt as part of  Presidential Proclamation 2276, issued on March 21, 1938.

President George W. Bush issued proclamation 8124 on April 11, 2007, stating that "... on Thomas Jefferson Day, we commemorate the birthday of a monumental figure whose place in our Nation’s history will always be cherished".

References

April observances
Public holidays in the United States
Thomas Jefferson
Presidential birthdays in the United States